Henry Bolton Graham Eyres-Monsell, 2nd Viscount Monsell (21 November 1905–28 November 1993) served in the Intelligence Corps during the Second World War, reaching the rank of lieutenant colonel.  He was mentioned in dispatches on 16 September 1943 and recommended for the MBE for his services to security during the planning stages of Operation Torch.  No confirmation of this latter award has been found.  However, he was awarded the United States Medal of Freedom with Bronze Palm.

He was the son of Bolton Eyres Monsell and his wife Sybil (née Eyres).  His father, who was Conservative Member of Parliament for Evesham from 1910 to 1935, served as Conservative Chief Whip from 1923 to 1929, and First Lord of the Admiralty from 1931 to 1936 and became Viscount Monsell in 1935.  The second Lord Monsell had three sisters, one of whom, Joan was a photographer who married Paddy Leigh Fermor.

A homosexual bachelor, he died without issue. The title Viscount Monsell is now extinct. The Cotswolds family seat, Dumbleton Hall, is now a hotel.

Arms

References

Viscounts in the Peerage of the United Kingdom
1905 births
1994 deaths
Alumni of Merton College, Oxford
LGBT peers